Capitolio Nacional (or National Capitol) is a building on Bolivar Square in central Bogotá, the construction of which began in 1848 and was finished in 1926. It houses both houses of the Congress of Colombia. It was designed by Thomas Reed.

Murals
In 1938, Ignacio Gómez Jaramillo painted two murals for the Capitolio Nacional in Bogotá.

In 1947 for the Inter American Conference, Santiago Martínez Delgado painted a majestic mural under commission of the then director of the OEA, Alberto Lleras Camargo and Conference organizer Laureano Gómez, two men who later became Presidents of Colombia.
This mural of the Elliptic chamber National Congress Building, made in the fresco style, represents Bolivar and Santander exiting the Cucuta congress during the creation of the Great Colombia. The mural is considered the most important fresco in the country and the artist's main masterpiece.

See also
List of buildings in Bogotá

References

External links

Government buildings in Colombia
Buildings and structures in Bogotá
Seats of national legislatures
National Monuments of Colombia
Landmarks in Colombia
Government buildings completed in 1926
1926 in Colombia
Tourist attractions in Bogotá
Architecture of Bogotá
Neoclassical palaces
Neoclassical architecture in Colombia